Donald Franklin Murry (October 5, 1899 – June 30, 1951) was an American football guard for the Racine Legion and Chicago Bears of the National Football League (NFL).

References

External links
 

1899 births
1951 deaths
Chicago Bears players
Racine Legion players
Wisconsin Badgers football players
People from Taylorville, Illinois
Players of American football from Illinois